Robert John Scarr (13 August 1926 – 16 February 2001) was a Canadian basketball player. He competed in the men's tournament at the 1948 Summer Olympics.

References

External links
 

1926 births
2001 deaths
Canadian men's basketball players
Olympic basketball players of Canada
Basketball players at the 1948 Summer Olympics
Basketball players from Vancouver
UBC Thunderbirds basketball players